Pharmaceutical Society of Nigeria (PSN) is a professional body for practicing pharmacists in Nigeria and was established in  to instill discipline and maintaining professional ethics among members of the organization. The first president of the association was Late Mr T.K.E Phillips, who was inaugurated as the president in the year 1947. In 1956, the association was formally incorporated under its Articles of Association and was recognized as a professional society in Nigeria by the Federal government.

Some past executives of the society include Olumide Akintayo, Adelusi Adeluyi, Lady Eme Ufot Ekaette, Ahmed Yakasai, Sam Ohuabunwa etc.

Aims and Objectives
 To promote and maintain a high standard of Pharmaceutical Education in Nigeria
 To maintain a high standard of Professional ethics and discipline among its members
 To promote legislation for the enhancement of the image and the interest of the Pharmacy Profession and the Practitioners in Nigeria
 To advice on Labour conditions relating to Pharmacists
 To collate and disseminate statistical, scientific and other information relating to Pharmacy and publish such in an Official Journal

References

Professional associations based in Nigeria
Pharmacy-related professional associations